Templeport is a civil parish in the barony of Tullyhaw, County Cavan, Ireland. The chief towns in the parish are Bawnboy and Ballymagauran. The large Roman Catholic parish of Templeport containing 42,172 statute acres was split up in the 18th & 19th centuries into three new parishes, Templeport, Corlough and Glangevlin.

Etymology

The name of Templeport parish derives from the old townland of Templeport (which is now shortened to Port) which is the anglicisation of the Gaelic 'Teampall An Phoirt' ("The Church of the Port or Bank or Landing-Place"). The church referred to is the old church on St. Mogue's Island in the middle of Port Lake. This church fell into disuse in medieval times and a new church was built on the opposite shore of the lake. It was forfeited to Queen Elizabeth in 1590 and started use as a Protestant church in about 1610. It is very unlikely that the island church ever served as the parish church because there was only one boat available and it would have been extremely inconvenient if not logistically impossible for hundreds of worshipers to go to and from the church in time for mass, especially in rough winter weather. It was built firstly for the convenience of any pilgrim wishing to go to St. Mogue's birthplace and secondly as an interment chapel for the few family members attending burials on the island.

History

The earliest mention of the name in the Vatican archives is for  2 September 1414- To the archdeacon of Kilmore. Mandate to collate and assign to Magonius Macamragan, priest, of the diocese of Kilmore, if found fit, the perpetual vicarage, value not exceeding 6 marks, of Insula Brechungy alias Tempullapuret in the said diocese, collation and provision of which, on its voidance by the death of Andrew Macgamragan, was made to him by bishop Nicholas. He doubts whether the said collation and provision of the said vicarage which, as the pope has learned, is still void as above, holds good. Dignum [arbitramur].

The earliest mention of the name in the annals of Ireland is in the Annals of the Four Masters for 1496 A.D.- "M1496.17- Magauran, i.e. Donnell Bearnagh, Chief of Teallach-Eachdhach, was treacherously slain before the altar of the church of Teampall-an-phuirt, by Teige, the son of Hugh, son of Owen Magauran; and the marks of the blows aimed at him are still visible in the corners of the altar."

The parish was famous in ancient Ireland as the location of Magh Slécht and the centre of worship of the pagan god Crom Cruach.

Two saints are associated with the parish, Saint Banban the Wise and Saint Mogue.

In medieval times the parish was divided into areas called ballibetoes. The "Survey of County Cavan" held by Sir John Davis on 6 September 1608 (Analecta Hibernica Vol.3, 1931) states- 
“Barony of Lissenouer alias Tullaghehaagh. The temporal lands within this barony are divided into Ballibetoes, each ballibetagh containing a certain number of polls, each poll containing one with another 24 acres of arable land, meadow and pasture. The names of which ballybetoes are-
1.	Ballymackgawran containing 18 polls (now Ballymagauran)
2.	Ballymackgonghan containing 12 polls (now Bellaleenan)
3.	Ballycloinelogh containing 12 polls4.	Ballentulchoe containing 13 polls5.	Balleagheboynagh containing 16 polls6.	Ballygortnekargie containing 11 polls (now Gortnacargy)
7.	Ballycooleigie containing 14 polls (now Coologe)
8.	Callvagh containing 22 polls (now Tomregan)
9.	Aghycloony containing 24 polls (Noclone in Kinawley)Total polls 143Total acres 3,432Value of each poll is 3 Irish shillings per annum.”''

The townlands of Templeport civil parish are:
Altachullion Upper (Altachullion Upper);
Ballymagauran (Ballymagovern);
Ballymagirril (Ballymagirl);
Ballynamaddoo (Ballinamaddoo);
Bawnboy;
Bellaleenan;
Bofealan;
Boley, Templeport;
Brackley, Templeport;
Burren;
Camagh;
Carrick East;
Cavanaquill;
Cloncurkney;
Cloneary;
Clontycarnaghan (Clintycarnaghan); 
Coologe (Cooleague);
Cor, Templeport;
Corboy Glebe;
Cornagunleog;
Corneen;
Corran (Curran, Currin);
Corrasmongan;
Crossmakelagher (Cross); 
Derrycassan (Derrycassion);
Derrymony (Derrymoney);
Derryragh;
Drumane;
Drumlougher;
Erraran;
Gortaclogher;
Gorteen, Templeport;
Gortmore;
Gortnaleck;
Gortnavreeghan;
Gortullaghan;
Gowlagh North;
Gowlagh South;
Greagh;
Keenagh, Templeport;
Kildoagh;
Killycluggin;
Killycrin;
Killymoriarty;
Killynaff;
Killyneary;
Killyran;
Killywaum;
Killywillin (Killywilly);
Kilnavert (Kilnavart);
Kilsallagh;
Kilsob;
Lakefield, Templeport;
Lecharrownahone (Lahernahone);
Lissanover (Lisanover);
Moherloob;
Moherreagh (Moheragh);
Muinaghan (Meenaghan);
Mullaghlea;
Mullaghmore, Templeport;
Munlough North;
Munlough South;
Newtown, Templeport;
Owengallees (Owengallis);
Port, Templeport;
Porturlan;
Ray;
Rosehill, Templeport;
Sralahan or the Common;
Sruhagh;
Stranadarragh;
Toberlyan;
Toberlyan Duffin;
Tonyhallagh;
Tonyrevan;
Urhannagh (Urinagh).

See also
 Francis Duffy (bishop)
 Cormac Mác Shamhradháin
 McGovern (name)
 Brian ‘Breaghach’ Mág Samhradháin
 Edmund MacGauran
 James Magauran

References

Further reading

External links
Templeport Genealogy Records

Civil parishes of County Cavan